The Men's Boxing Tournament at the 1951 Pan American Games was held in Buenos Aires, Argentina, from February 25 to March 8, with the hosting nation winning in all eight weight divisions.


Medal winners

Medal table

References 
 Amateur Boxing: 1951 Pan American Games
 
 
  .

1951
Boxing
Pan American Games
1951 Pan American Games